IAPP may refer to:

Science and technology
 Islet amyloid polypeptide, a protein produced by the pancreatic beta-cell that has been linked to type II diabetes
 Inter-Access Point Protocol (IEEE 802.11F), an optional extension to IEEE 802.11 that provides wireless access-point communications among multivendor systems
 iOS application or iApp

Organisations
 International Association of Panoramic Photographers
 International Association of Privacy Professionals
 International Association of Parliamentarians for Peace